The Embarcadero and Folsom station (often simply Folsom) is a Muni Metro light rail station located in the median of The Embarcadero between Folsom Street and Harrison Street in the Rincon Hill area of San Francisco, California. Muni Metro trains use a high-level island platform, while historic streetcars use a pair of side platforms (The Embarcadero and Harrison) at the southeast end of the station next to the Harrison Street grade crossing.

History 

The station opened on January 10, 1998, as part of the Muni Metro Extension project. It was initially served by a temporary E Embarcadero line between Embarcadero station and 4th and King/Caltrain station. N Judah service replaced the shuttle service on August 22, 1998. T Third Street service began on April 7, 2007; N Judah service was initially cut back to Embarcadero station, with J Church service added at peak hours. On June 30, 2007, the J and N were restored to their previous configuration. E Embarcadero heritage streetcar service was added on August 1, 2015.

References

External links 

SFMTA – The Embarcadero & Folsom St: northbound, southbound
SF Bay Transit (unofficial): The Embarcadero & Folsom St, The Embarcadero & Harrison St

Folsom
Railway stations in the United States opened in 1998